John E. Jackson (February 14, 1885 – June 17, 1971) was an American sport shooter who competed in the 1912 Summer Olympics.  Representing the United States he won the gold medal in the team military rifle competition and the bronze medal in the 600 metre free rifle event. In the 300 metre military rifle, three positions he finished 33rd.

He was born in Lincoln, Nebraska and died in Fairfield, Iowa.

References

External links
profile

1885 births
1971 deaths
American male sport shooters
ISSF rifle shooters
Shooters at the 1912 Summer Olympics
Olympic gold medalists for the United States in shooting
Olympic bronze medalists for the United States in shooting
Sportspeople from Lincoln, Nebraska
Medalists at the 1912 Summer Olympics
People from Fairfield, Iowa
19th-century American people
20th-century American people